The Essential Blood, Sweat & Tears is a compilation album by the band Blood, Sweat & Tears, released by Columbia Records/Sony Music on April 4, 2014. This compilation contains various singles and album tracks that were recorded and released from 1967 to 1976 while the band was signed to Columbia Records.

This compilation was originally released as a digital download in the United States through services such as iTunes, and Amazon.com.

Track listing

Disc 1

Disc 2 

Blood, Sweat & Tears albums
Columbia Records compilation albums
2014 compilation albums